Jania is a genus of red macroalgae (or seaweeds) with hard, calcareous, branching skeletons in the family Corallinaceae.

Taxonomy and Nomenclature 
The genus name of Jania is derived from the Greek water nymph called Ianeira (or Janeria). It was first circumscribed by Jean Vincent Félix Lamouroux in 1812. Based on a recent integrated taxonomic examination of the genus, and by extension its tribe Janieae, the members of Cheilosporum and Haliptilon have all been transferred under genus Jania. As a result, there is currently around 55 confirmed species for this genus.

Morphology 
Jania is an articulated coralline algae characterized by having erect thalli with dichotomously-arranged branches composed of alternating segments of red or pink, calcified, cylindrical sections (intergeniculum) and white uncalcified sections (geniculum); that is attached to the substrate by small, stolon-like holdfasts. Intergenicula of this genus can be cylindrical, subcylindrical or compressed and smooth, winged or lobed.

Distribution 
Jania species are well-distributed throughout the world.

Ecology 
Members of the genus are found in sheltered reef habitats, often in crevices or other shaded areas. They are also epilithic, epiphytic, and could form free-living clumps called articuliths.

Life history 
Like most red seaweeds, Jania exhibit a triphasic life cycle wherein aside from the free-living haploid (gametophyte) and diploid (tetrasporophyte) generations, another diploid generation that is parasitic to the gametophyte, the carposporophyte. Tetrasporophyte (2N) generation would release four haploid spores (or tetraspores) that would later on develop into either the male and female gametophytes; moreover, the spermatium (N) produced by the spermatangia will be trapped by the trichogyne of the carpogonium (N) of the female gametophyte and later on fuse to form the zygote and subsequently develop into the carposporophyte (2N); lastly the carposporophyte will produce carpospores (2N) that will become the tetratsporophyte (2N). The unique structure involved in coralline reproduction is the presence of the conceptacle, a calcified depression wherein the tetrasporangia, spermatangia, and carposporangia are formed.

Exploitation/harvesting/cultivation 
There is no known cultivation technology for this genus.

Chemical composition/natural products chemistry 
Priming tomato seeds with Jania polysaccharides has shown to greatly improve the resistance of seedlings to soil-borne pathogens and consequently promote plant growth.

Utilization and management 
Despite the potential use of Jania in agriculture and Due to a lack of interest on this genus, this genus is not currently being commercially utilized.

Species
The World Register of Marine Species list the following:

Jania acutiloba (Decaisne) J.H. Kim
Jania adhaerens J.V.Lamouroux, 1816
Jania affinis Harvey, 1855
Jania arborescens (Yendo) Yendo, 1905
Jania articulata N'Yuert & Payri, 2009
Jania capillacea Harvey, 1853
Jania crassa J.V.Lamouroux, 1821
Jania cristata (Linnaeus) Endlicher, 1843
Jania cubensis Montagne ex Kützing, 1849
Jania cultrata (Harvey) J.H. Kim
Jania decussatodichotoma (Yendo) Yendo, 1905
Jania fastigiata Harvey, 1849
Jania intermedia (Kützing) P.C.Silva, 1996
Jania iyengarii E.Ganesan, 1966
Jania lobata Zanardini, 1858
Jania longiarthra E.Y.Dawson, 1953
Jania longifurca Zanardini, 1844
Jania micrarthrodia J.V.Lamouroux, 1816
Jania minuta Johansen & Womersley, 1994
Jania nipponica (Yendo) Yendo, 1905
Jania novae-zelandiae Harvey, 1855
Jania pacifica Areschoug, 1852
Jania parva Johansen & Womersley, 1994
Jania prolifera A.B. Joly, 1966
Jania pulchella (Harvey) Johansen & Womersley, 1994
Jania pumila J.V.Lamouroux, 1816
Jania pusilla (Sonder) Yendo, 1905
Jania pygmaea J.V.Lamouroux, 1816
Jania radiata Yendo, 1905
Jania rosea (Lamarck) Decaisne, 1842
Jania rubens (Linnaeus) J.V.Lamouroux, 1816
Jania rubrens (L.) Lamour
Jania sagittata (J.V.Lamouroux) Blainville, 1834
Jania santae-marthae Schnetter
Jania spectabile (Harvey ex Grunow)
Jania squamata (Linnaeus) J.H. Kim,
Jania subpinnata E.Y.Dawson, 1953
Jania subulata (Ellis & Solander) Sonder, 1848
Jania tenella (Kützing) Grunow, 1874
Jania ungulata (Yendo) Yendo, 1905
Jania verrucosa J.V.Lamouroux, 1816
Jania yenoshimensis (Yendo) Yendo, 1905

References

Corallinaceae
Red algae genera